Janice Leigh Limson is a South African Professor of Biotechnology, former Chairperson the School of Biotechnology at Rhodes University and the SARChI Chair in Biotechnology Innovation & Engagement at Rhodes University. She is founder and editor-in-chief of the magazine Science in Africa, the first popular online science magazine for Africa. Her research focuses on topics ranging from the development of nanotechnology biosensors for cancer diagnostics, drug delivery, detection of pathogens in food to the design of fuel cell technology.

Education and career 

Limson grew up in Port Elizabeth, South Africa. She subsequently moved to Grahamstown, and she studied at Rhodes University where she completed her BSc (Honours) in 1994. In 1997 she was awarded a PhD in Chemistry at Rhodes University. She completed a Postgraduate diploma in Tertiary education from 2006 to 2008.

In 1999 Limson was a postdoctoral research fellow at the University of Texas Health Science Center at San Antonio. The next year she founded the online magazine Science in Africa and became its editor in chief. The magazine aims to serve "as a platform for scientists in a broad range of fields in Africa to report on their research, giving their expert views on topical issues in science and providing the right information to an African public seeking a deeper understanding of science and of the dynamic role it plays in everyone's lives."

In 2003 Limson established the BioSENS (Sensors, Energy and Nanomaterials) Research Group at Rhodes for the development of nanotechnology biosensors for cancer diagnostics and drug delivery. The establishment in 2007 of the DST/Mintek-sponsored Nanotechnology Innovation Centre at the University of the Western Cape, University of Johannesburg and Rhodes University greatly assisted this research.

From 2003 until 2009 Limson was a lecturer at Rhodes university, and in 2010 she was appointed Associate Professor at Rhodes. She also received the Vice-Chancellor's Distinguished Research Award in that year for "the volume and impact of her research outputs". In 2011 she became Chairperson of the Rhodes University School of Biotechnology. In 2014 she was awarded Professor of Biotechnology and was appointed Director of Rhodes University Biotechnology Innovation Centre. The Centre has since launched its first products, catalysts for sensors, and is working on sensors for CD4 and malaria in a partnership with UNICEF and the South African Medical Research Council.

In 2015 she was appointed to the DSI/NRF South African Research Chairs Initiative (SARChI) Chair in Biotechnology Innovation & Engagement at Rhodes.

In March 2019 she contributed to a series of public lectures on "Truth and Trustworthiness in Science" co-ordinated by the ASSAf and the British High Commission in South Africa. The discussion she was involved with was entitled: "Misunderstandings and Misuses: Science Journalism".

Limson is the editor of the South African Agency for Science and Technology Advancement (SAASTA) Nanotechnology Public Engagement Programme’s newsletter, called Nanotech Public Engagement, and is a fellow of The African Academy of Sciences.

Awards and recognition 
Limson has received numerous awards, including:
 2011 Department of Science and Technology Women in Science Awards in the Life Sciences. First Runner Up
 2010 Vice-Chancellor's Distinguished Research Medal, Rhodes University
 2010 M&G Top Young South Africans To Take To Lunch!
 2009 M&G Top Young South Africans To Take To Lunch!
 2002 NSTF Awards for Outstanding Contribution to Science, Engineering & Technology, South Africa
 2001 Highway Africa “Innovative use of New Media in Africa” Journalism Award.

Selected publications

Journals

Books

References

External links
 
Science in Africa website

Living people
South African women scientists
Rhodes University alumni
Academic staff of Rhodes University
Women biotechnologists
People from Port Elizabeth
Year of birth missing (living people)
Fellows of the African Academy of Sciences